= No3 =

No3 may refer to:

- Number 3
- Nitrate, NO_{3}^{–}
